Shane Jeremy Costa (born December 12, 1981) is a former professional baseball player.

Costa was born in Visalia, California and measures 6'0" and 220 lbs. From California State University, Fullerton, Costa made his Major League debut on June 2, against the New York Yankees. He graduated from Golden West High School in 2000.

On December 16, 2009, Costa re-signed with the Kansas City Royals on a minor league contract, however he did not receive an invite to spring training. On March 8, 2011, he signed a contract with the St. Paul Saints. Costa played for the Saints during the 2012 season as well.

References

External links

1981 births
Living people
Kansas City Royals players
Major League Baseball outfielders
Baseball players from California
Wilmington Blue Rocks players
Arizona League Royals players
Wichita Wranglers players
Omaha Royals players
Northwest Arkansas Naturals players
St. Paul Saints players
Cal State Fullerton Titans baseball players
Cal State San Bernardino Coyotes baseball players